The Flores mud moray (Gymnothorax davidsmithi) is an eel in the family Muraenidae (moray eels). It was described by John E. McCosker and John Ernest Randall in 2008. It is a tropical, marine eel which is known from Indonesia, in the western Pacific Ocean. It is known to dwell at a depth range of 3–4 m. Males can reach a maximum total length of 29.9 cm.

The species epithet refers to David G. Smith, in honour of his contributions towards knowledge of eels.

References

Muraenidae
Fish described in 2008